Bailey Jay (born November 5, 1988) is an American transgender pornographic actress, adult model, presenter and podcaster.

Career 
In 2011 and 2012, Jay won the AVN Award for transgender performer of the year. She also co-hosts the podcast The Bailey Jay Show (formerly Bailey Jay Radio) with her husband, photographer Matthew Terhune, the podcast The Trans Witching Hour with Bailey Jay (formerly Gender Coaching with Bailey Jay) that deals with spirituality, the horror-themed podcast Blood Lust with Bailey Jay and also co-hosts the transgender and transsexuality advice podcast Sugar and Spice (formerly Third Gender Radio) with Jen Richards of We Happy Trans.

In 2014 she worked as a presenter for Vice Media on The Jim Norton Show. She appeared as a co-host in all four episodes before the show's cancellation.

Filmography and appearances

Filmography

Podcasts

Awards 
 2010 Transgender Erotica Award winner – Best Solo Model
 2011 AVN Award winner – Transsexual Performer of the Year
 2011 XBIZ Award nominee – Transsexual Performer of the Year
 2012 AVN Award winner – Transsexual Performer of the Year
 2012 XBIZ Award nominee – Transsexual Performer of the Year
 2016 AVN Award winner – Favorite Trans Performer (Fan award)

References

External links 

 
 
 
 

1988 births
American podcasters
American pornographic film actresses
American LGBT broadcasters
American LGBT actors
LGBT people from Virginia
Living people
Pornographic film actors from Virginia
Actresses from Richmond, Virginia
Transgender pornographic film actresses
Transgender female adult models
Transgender erotica
AVN Award winners
Transgender Erotica Award winners
American women podcasters
21st-century LGBT people